Mitch Cornish (born 28 January 1993) is an Australian former professional rugby league footballer who last played for the Sydney Roosters in the National Rugby League, as a  or . He previously played for the Canberra Raiders.

Background
Cornish was born in Goulburn, New South Wales, Australia. He is the older brother of former Gold Coast Titans player Tyler Cornish.

He played his junior rugby league for the Goulburn Stockmen, before being signed by the Canberra Raiders.

Playing career

Early career
From 2011 to 2013, Cornish played for the Raiders' NYC team On 7 June 2012, he extended his contract with the Raiders from the end of 2013 to the end of 2015. On 21 August 2012, he was named at halfback in the 2012 NYC Team of the Year. On 13 October 2012, he played for the Junior Kangaroos against the Junior Kiwis, due to a late injury to Lachlan Maranta which resulted in Ben Hampton taking Maranta's spot at fullback and Cornish taking Hampton's bench spot. In November and December 2012, he attended the Blues Origin Pathways camp designed for possible future New South Wales State of Origin representatives. On 20 April 2013, he played for the New South Wales under-20s team against the Queensland under-20s team, playing at halfback and was awarded the Darren Lockyer Medal as Man of the Match in the Blues' 36-12 win at Penrith Stadium. On 27 August 2013, he was named on the interchange bench in the 2013 NYC Team of the Year, making the team for the second year in a row. On 13 October 2013, he again played for the Junior Kangaroos against the Junior Kiwis, this time co-captaining the side alongside Michael Lichaa.

2014
In 2014, Cornish moved on to the Raiders' New South Wales Cup team, Mount Pritchard Mounties. On 15 and 16 February, he played for the Raiders in the inaugural NRL Auckland Nines. In Round 11 of the 2014 NRL season, he made his NRL debut for the Raiders against the North Queensland Cowboys, playing off the interchange bench in the Raiders' 42-12 win at Canberra Stadium. On 9 July, he played for the New South Wales Residents against the Queensland Residents, playing at halfback in New South Wales' 24-16 loss at Suncorp Stadium. In Round 25 against the Wests Tigers at Canberra Stadium, he started at halfback in the NRL for the first time, as the Raiders went on to win 27-12. He finished off his debut year in the NRL having played in 8 matches for the Raiders.

2015
On 27 September, Cornish was named at halfback in the 2015 New South Wales Cup Team of the Year. On 21 October, he signed a 1-year contract with the Parramatta Eels starting in 2016.

2016
Cornish played for the Parramatta Eels who won the 2016 NRL Auckland Nines.

After failing to play a first-grade game for the Eels, late in the year, Cornish signed a contract with the Sydney Roosters for 2017.

2017
In February Cornish was selected to play in the 2017 NRL Auckland Nines. The Roosters won the final.

2018
On 31 October, it was announced by the Sydney Roosters that Cornish had retired from rugby league and will now move into the insurance industry after taking up a job on the Central Coast.

References

External links

Sydney Roosters profile
Roosters profile

1993 births
Living people
Australian rugby league players
Canberra Raiders players
Sydney Roosters players
Junior Kangaroos players
Mount Pritchard Mounties players
Rugby league halfbacks
Rugby league five-eighths
Rugby league players from Goulburn, New South Wales